Platanthera cooperi is an uncommon species of orchid known by the common names Cooper's rein orchid and chaparral rein orchid.

Distribution
The orchid is endemic to chaparral, coastal sage scrub, and oak woodland habitats. It is native to southern California and the border area in Baja California.

It is found in the Santa Monica Mountains, Simi Hills, and San Gabriel Mountains of the Transverse Ranges; Santa Catalina Island and San Clemente Island of the Channel Islands, and the Santa Ana Mountains and Cuyamaca Mountains of the Peninsular Ranges.

Description
The basal leaves are up to 20 centimeters long by 3 cm wide. Leaves higher on the stem are much reduced.

The upper part of the stem is a spikelike inflorescence of many small green flowers, which are honey-scented in the evenings.  Its bloom period is from March to June.

Conservation
This orchid is a listed vulnerable species on the California Native Plant Society Inventory of Rare and Endangered Plants.

References

External links
 Calflora Database: Piperia cooperi (Cooper's rein orchid)
 Jepson Manual eFlora (TJM2) treatment of Piperia cooperi
 USDA Plants Profile for Piperia cooperi
 Flora of North America
 UC Photos gallery — Piperia cooperi

cooperi
Orchids of California
Orchids of Mexico
Flora of Baja California
Natural history of the California chaparral and woodlands
Natural history of the Channel Islands of California
Natural history of the Peninsular Ranges
Natural history of the Santa Monica Mountains
Natural history of the Transverse Ranges
Flora without expected TNC conservation status